Phichai, Lampang is a tambon (subdistrict) of Mueang Lampang District, in Lampang Province, Thailand. In 2005 it had a population of 21,058 people. The tambon contains 16 villages.

References

Tambon of Lampang province
Populated places in Lampang province